Stephanie Charles is an American actress.

Biography

Charles was born in Boston, Massachusetts to Haitian parents. She speaks both English and Haitian Creole.

Career

She moved to Los Angeles when she was seven years old and later began acting. She appeared in sitcom include Smart Guy, Sister, Sister, and had a recurring role on The Parent 'Hood. Charles later left acting and formed an R&B girl group called MRZ, they were signed to the Universal/Motown label and worked in New York. Then the group broke up, she returned to Los Angeles and began acting again, appearing in film and television.

In 2018, Charles starred in the Oprah Winfrey Network sitcom The Paynes produced by Tyler Perry, playing the role of Nyla. The series was canceled after one season of 38 episodes. Perry later cast her in his BET+ soap opera Ruthless.

Filmography

Film/Movie

Television

References

External links
 

21st-century American actresses
African-American actresses
American film actresses
American television actresses
Living people
21st-century African-American women
21st-century African-American people
Year of birth missing (living people)